Claudia Nicoleitzik (born 8 December 1989) is a Paralympian athlete from Germany competing mainly in category T36 sprint events.

She competed in the 2008 Summer Paralympics in Beijing, and the 2012 Summer Paralympics in London.  In 2008 she won a silver medal in the women's 100 metres – T36 event and a silver medal in the women's 200 metres – T36 event. In 2012 she won a bronze medal in the women's 200 metres – T36 event.

External links
 
 

1989 births
Living people
Paralympic athletes of Germany
Paralympic silver medalists for Germany
Paralympic bronze medalists for Germany
Paralympic medalists in athletics (track and field)
Athletes (track and field) at the 2008 Summer Paralympics
Athletes (track and field) at the 2012 Summer Paralympics
Athletes (track and field) at the 2016 Summer Paralympics
Medalists at the 2008 Summer Paralympics
Medalists at the 2012 Summer Paralympics
Medalists at the 2016 Summer Paralympics
Medalists at the World Para Athletics European Championships
Medalists at the World Para Athletics Championships
World Para Athletics Championships winners
20th-century German women
21st-century German women